Helicops pastazae, Shreve's keelback, is a species of snake in the family Colubridae. 

It is found in Ecuador, Colombia, Venezuela, and Peru.

References 

Helicops]
Snakes of South America
Reptiles of Ecuador
Reptiles of Colombia
Reptiles of Venezuela
Reptiles of Peru
Reptiles described in 1934
Taxa named by Benjamin Shreve